Spring Creek Township is an inactive township in Phelps County, in the U.S. state of Missouri.

Spring Creek Township takes its name from Spring Creek.

References

Townships in Missouri
Townships in Phelps County, Missouri

Spring Creek had a Post Office and General Store on CR# 6410, until 1944.